The 2012–13 UTEP Miners basketball team represented the University of Texas at El Paso during the 2012–13 NCAA Division I men's basketball season. The Miners, led by third year head coach Tim Floyd, played their home games at the Don Haskins Center and were members of Conference USA. They finished the season 18–14, 10–6 in C-USA play to finish in third place. They advanced to the semifinals of the Conference USA tournament where they lost to Southern Miss. Despite the 18 wins, they did not participate in a postseason tournament. UTEP averaged 8,490 fans per game, ranking 52nd nationally.

Roster

Schedule

|-
!colspan=9| Exhibition

|-
!colspan=9| Regular season

|-
!colspan=9| 2013 Conference USA men's basketball tournament

References

UTEP Miners men's basketball seasons
UTEP